Artia is an unincorporated community in Buchanan County, Virginia, United States.

References

Unincorporated communities in Buchanan County, Virginia
Unincorporated communities in Virginia